Frederick Dent Grant (May 30, 1850 – April 12, 1912) was a soldier and United States minister to Austria-Hungary. Grant was the first son of General and President of the United States Ulysses S. Grant and Julia Grant. He was named after his uncle, Frederick Dent.

Early life
His father was in the United States Army when Frederick was born in St. Louis, Missouri. The family moved as the senior Grant was assigned to posts in Michigan and New York. Frederick spent his early childhood at his paternal grandparents' house while his father was stationed on the West Coast. After his father's resignation from the army, the family lived in St. Louis and in Galena, Illinois.

Grant attended public school in Galena until the outbreak of the American Civil War in 1861. Grant's father organized a volunteer regiment and was made colonel. Frederick accompanied his father when the regiment was sent to northern Missouri, but he was sent home when it arrived. He then rejoined his father off and on during several campaigns during the war. Eager to be a part of the action, Frederick put himself in harm's way many times while with his father. This happened for the last time during the decisive battle that ended the Siege of Vicksburg. During the battle, Frederick rode off onto the field and was shot in the leg by a Confederate sniper. Normally his wound would have called for amputation; however, possibly due to his military aspirations or his father's rank, this did not occur. Despite a painful infection, doctors were able to save his leg. In his weakened state, Frederick fell victim to typhoid fever, which was common in Union camps during the war, but made a full recovery.

West Point controversy
Grant was appointed to West Point in 1866 and graduated in 1871.

On June 1, 1870, the first African American cadet, James Webster Smith, from South Carolina, was admitted into the United States Military Academy. Smith was sponsored by Senator Adelbert Ames of Mississippi and nominated by Representative Solomon L. Hoge of South Carolina. Smith was handpicked for his outstanding character and scholarly ability by David Clark, a northern philanthropist. While at West Point, Smith was forced to endure intense racism and violence, and was shunned by other West Point attendees. Frederick Dent Grant has been accused of having been one of Smith's harassers.

While Grant was named as one of the chief persecutors by William McFeely in his 1981 biography of Ulysses S. Grant, quoted as saying to his father, then President, that "no damned nigger will ever graduate from West Point," recent scholarship has raised questions about McFeely's sources. The evidence McFeely employs to assert Grant's racism comes from an entirely separate hazing incident in 1870 involving a number of white cadets that Smith was never involved with. In a January 1871 investigation of the hazing, Grant testified to the Committee on Military Affairs that he was aware of the prank, that he supported it, and that he did nothing to stop it. McFeely conflates Grant's testimony from this case with the separate court martial cases against Smith to make it look like he was aware of and supported Smith's harassment. In actuality, Grant never testified in Smith's cases, nor did he admit to playing any role in his harassment. In addition, the inflammatory racism cited by McFeely was described by a witness who was not present at the meeting.

Smith was later discharged after failing an unconventional private examination by Professor Peter Michie. While Grant denied being a leader of the cadets who hazed Smith for being an African American, there is evidence to suggest he actively participated. Smith died of tuberculosis in 1876 and was granted a posthumous commission in the United States Army in 1997.

Early military career
Upon graduating from West Point, Grant was assigned to the 4th U.S. Cavalry Regiment. He took a leave of absence to work with the Union Pacific Railroad as a civil engineer. Late in 1871, he was aide-de-camp to General William Tecumseh Sherman in Europe. He rejoined the 4th Cavalry in Texas in 1872.

In 1873, he was assigned to the staff of General Philip Sheridan and promoted to lieutenant colonel. He was on a Yellowstone Expedition and was with George Armstrong Custer during the Black Hills expedition.

His daughter Julia was born on June 6, 1876. Grant received leave to travel to Washington, D.C. for her birth.

In 1877, he took a leave of absence to accompany his father on a trip around the world.

In 1878, Grant was in the Bannock War and was in the fight against Victorio in New Mexico.

Civilian career
Frederick Grant resigned from the U.S. Army in 1881, and assisted his father in preparing the latter's memoirs. During this time, he was in business in New York City.

In 1887, he ran on the Republican ticket for Secretary of State of New York, but was defeated by the Democratic incumbent Frederick Cook. In 1889, President Benjamin Harrison appointed him the U.S. Minister to Austria-Hungary. After Grover Cleveland became president in March 1893, Grant continued in his post until his successor presented his credentials on June 8, 1893.

Grant became a commissioner of police in New York City in 1894, an office he held until 1898. He served on the Police Commission along with future President Theodore Roosevelt.

Spanish–American War and later military career
When the Spanish–American War started in 1898, Grant was commissioned as colonel of the 14th New York Volunteers on May 2, 1898, and was promoted to brigadier general of volunteers on the 27th of the same month. He arrived in Ponce, Puerto Rico on August 16 and participated in the occupation of Puerto Rico under General Nelson Miles. 

In 1899, Grant was sent to the Philippines for service in the Philippine–American War. He arrived in Manila on June 19 and was given command of 2d Brigade, 1st Division, 8th Corps (southern line) on July 1. On February 18, 1901, he was commissioned a brigadier general in the Regular Army. He remained in the Philippines until October 1902.

When he returned to the United States, he held various commands and was promoted to major general in February 1906. In May 1906 he asked that YMCAs be established at every post under his command because the associations reduced "courts-martial and desertions,  and the enlisted men were more contented and happy. ... the service ... was invaluable to the army."

On July 25, 1910, he was made commander of the Department of the East. On July 11, 1911, he became commander for the Eastern Division which included the Department of the East and the Department of the Gulf.

Death
Frederick Dent Grant died of cancer, the same disease that had claimed his father, and diabetes in the Hotel Buckingham near Fort Jay on Governors Island in New York City on April 12, 1912. At the time of his death, Grant was the second most senior officer on active duty in the U.S. Army after Major General Leonard Wood. His funeral service was held in the chapel at Fort Jay and he was buried in the West Point Cemetery.

Memberships
Grant was a hereditary companion of the Military Order of the Loyal Legion of the United States by right of his father's service in the Civil War. He joined the Military Order of Foreign Wars as a Hereditary Companion in 1896 (of which he also became a Veteran Companion after the Spanish–American War in 1898). He was also a member of the Aztec Club of 1847, the Sons of the American Revolution, the Society of Colonial Wars, the Order of the Founders and Patriots of America and the Military Order of the Carabao.

Personal life

In 1874, Grant married Ida Marie Honoré (1854–1930), the daughter of Henry Hamilton Honoré, who made his fortune in Chicago real estate. Ida Marie's sister was Bertha Palmer, the wife of Chicago businessman Potter Palmer. They were married in Chicago and had two children:

 Julia Dent Grant (1876–1975), who married Prince Mikhail Cantacuzène, a Russian general and diplomat, in 1899.
 Ulysses S. Grant III (1881–1968), who married Edith Root (1878–1962), the daughter of Elihu Root, the U.S. Secretary of State, under President Theodore Roosevelt and U.S. Secretary of War under President William McKinley in 1907. He graduated from West Point in 1903 and served in both World Wars. He retired in 1946 as a major general.

Descendants
Through his daughter, Grant was the grandfather of Prince Michael Mikhailovich Cantacuzène, Princess Bertha Mikhailovna, and Princess Zenaida Mikhailovna, who married Sir John Coldbrook Hanbury-Williams, son of Major-General Sir John Hanbury-Williams.

Through his son Ulysses, Grant was the grandfather of three girls, Edith Clara Grant (1908–1995), who married David Wood Griffiths, Clara Frances Grant (1912–2005), who married Paul Ernest Ruestow, and Julia Grant, who married John S. Dietz.

Awards
 Indian Campaign Medal
 Spanish Campaign Medal
 Army of Puerto Rican Occupation Medal
 Philippine Campaign Medal

Dates of rank
Cadet, USMA – July 1, 1866
2nd Lieutenant, Regular Army – June 12, 1871
1st Lieutenant, Regular Army – June 28, 1876
Lieutenant Colonel, Aide de Camp – March 17, 1873
Resigned – October 1, 1881
Colonel, Volunteers – May 2, 1898
Brigadier General, Volunteers – May 27, 1898
Brigadier General, Regular Army – February 18, 1901
Major General, Regular Army – February 6, 1906

References

External links

 
 

1850 births
1912 deaths
Grant family
Ulysses S. Grant
Children of presidents of the United States
United States Military Academy alumni
Military personnel from St. Louis
American people of the Indian Wars
New York (state) Republicans
Ambassadors of the United States to Austria-Hungary
19th-century American diplomats
New York City Police Commissioners
American military personnel of the Spanish–American War
American military personnel of the Philippine–American War
United States Army generals
Deaths from cancer in New York (state)
Deaths from diabetes
Burials at West Point Cemetery